Pappophorum is a genus of plants in the grass family, native to the Western Hemisphere. Members of the genus are commonly known as pappusgrass.

 Species
 Pappophorum bicolor E.Fourn. – pink pappusgrass - Texas, Chihuahua, Coahuila, Durango, Guanajuato, D.F., Veracruz, Nuevo León, Tamaulipas, San Luis Potosí
 Pappophorum caespitosum R.E.Fr. - Bolivia, Argentina, Paraguay
 Pappophorum hassleri Hack. - Paraguay
 Pappophorum krapovickasii Roseng. - Bolivia, Argentina, Paraguay, Brazil
 Pappophorum mucronulatum Nees - Arizona, New Mexico, Texas, Mexico, Honduras, Colombia, Venezuela, Peru, Brazil, Argentina, Paraguay, Uruguay
 Pappophorum pappiferum (Lam.) Kuntze – limestone pappusgrass - Mexico, West Indies, South America
 Pappophorum philippianum Parodi - Brazil, Bolivia, Argentina, Uruguay, Chile, Sonora

 formerly included
see Bouteloua Bromus Enneapogon Pentameris Triodia

References

Chloridoideae
Poaceae genera